Rainer Funke (born 18 November 1940) is a German politician of the Free Democratic Party (FDP) and former member of the German Bundestag.

Life 
He was a member of the German Bundestag from 1980 to 1983 and again from 1987 to 2005.  After the 1990 parliamentary elections, Funke was appointed Parliamentary State Secretary to the Federal Minister of Justice in the Federal Government led by Chancellor Helmut Kohl on 24 January 1991.

Literature

References

1940 births
Members of the Bundestag for Hamburg
Members of the Bundestag 2002–2005
Members of the Bundestag 1998–2002
Members of the Bundestag 1994–1998
Members of the Bundestag 1990–1994
Members of the Bundestag 1987–1990
Members of the Bundestag 1980–1983
Members of the Bundestag for the Free Democratic Party (Germany)
Parliamentary State Secretaries of Germany
Date of death missing